The Balram class of tugboats is a series of service watercraft built by Goa Shipyard Limited for the Indian navy. Each tug in the class has a rated capacity of 20 tonnes bollard pull. They are powered by twin Kirloskar SEMT-Pielistick (8PA4 V200) of total . They are also fitted with three monitors for fire fighting. INS Bajrang and INS Balram are stationed at Mumbai.

Ships of the class

Specifications
Gross tonnage: 216 ton
DWT: 35 tons
Length: 29.7 m
Width: 9.7 m
Draught: 4.3 meters
Crew: 12 total
Speed:

See also
Tugboats of the Indian Navy

References

Ships of the Indian Navy
Auxiliary ships of the Indian Navy
Tugs of the Indian Navy
Auxiliary tugboat classes